The Verdant Mile is a 2004 extended play album by American folk singer Tracy Grammer.

Track listing 
 "The Verdant Mile" (Grammer)
 "This Dirty Little Town" (Kane)
 "Wasn't Born To Follow" (Goffin, King)
 "Solitary Man" (Diamond)
 "When I Reach The Place I'm Goin'" (Gordy, Henry)
 "Jackson's Tune/Trickster Tale/St. Anne's Reel" (Grammer/unknown/traditional)  
 "Old Paint" (traditional)

References

External links 
 Album page at official Tracy Grammer web site (lyrics and sound samples)

2004 debut EPs
Tracy Grammer albums